Fire in the Blood may refer to:
 Fire in the Blood, UK title of 1954 French film La Rage au corps
 Fire in the Blood, 1990 single by British band Matt Bianco
 Fire in the Blood, title of English translation of novel Chaleur du Sang by Irène Némirovsky, published posthumously in 2007
 Brimstone Angels: Fire in the Blood, title of a fantasy novel from the series The Brimstone Angels by Erin M. Evans, published in 2014
 Fire in the Blood (2013 film), documentary film
 Fire in the Blood (1953 film), a 1953 Spanish drama film